Market Garden Brewery is a brewery located in the Ohio City neighborhood of Cleveland, Ohio. The brewery, which began as a brewpub in 2011 adjacent to the West Side Market, expanded with the opening of a 35,000 square foot production brewhouse in the Spring of 2016. Market Garden's sister location, Nanobrew, is a smaller brewpub—also located on 25th Street—where the brewery develops most of its recipes for larger scale production. The brewery along with Great Lakes Brewing and the Platform Beer Company, comprises a section of Ohio City that is locally referred to as the Brewing District.

References

Manufacturing companies based in Cleveland
Beer brewing companies based in Ohio
Culture of Cleveland
Ohio City, Cleveland
2011 establishments in Ohio